Kennet Ahl is the pseudonym of Swedish team Lasse Strömstedt (23 May 1935 – 4 July 2009) and Christer Dahl (born 30 December 1940), who wrote crime novels together.

Works
Grundbulten (1974)
Lyftet (1976) or The Score
Rävsaxen (1978)
Slutstationen (1980)
Mordvinnaren (1987)
Högriskbegravning (2006)

Their 1976 novel Lyftet became a film of the same name in 1978, The Score.

References

Swedish thriller writers
Writing duos
Collective pseudonyms
Living people
20th-century Swedish novelists
20th-century pseudonymous writers
Year of birth missing (living people)